McGee is an unincorporated community in eastern Wayne County, Missouri, United States. The community lies on the south bank of McGee Creek on Missouri Route TT. The Mingo Swamp and wildlife reserve is about three miles to the southeast.

A post office called McGee has been in operation since 1906. The community has the name of Tom , a local postal worker.

References

Unincorporated communities in Wayne County, Missouri
Unincorporated communities in Missouri